James Goodman may refer to:

 James Goodman (cricketer) (born 1990), Kent County Cricket Club cricketer
 James A. Goodman (born 1936), American politician 
 James R. Goodman (born 1944), professor of computer science at the University of Auckland, New Zealand
 James U. Goodman (1872–1953), American politician
 James Goodman (musicologist) (1828–1896), clergyman, professor of Irish, and collector of Irish music
 Jim Goodman (American football), American football coach, scout, and executive